Bouraoui Belhadef  is a town and commune in Jijel Province, Algeria. According to the 2002 census it has a population of 10,965.

Bouraoui Belhadef is a commune named after Bouraoui Ali ben cherif, a local hero of the liberation war against the French 1954–1962. The second name Belhadef is the name of the centre of the commune. BOURAOUI BELHADEF WAS THE BASE OF THE HISTORIQUE WILAYA 2 (ESHAMAL EL KASSANTINI) IN TAZA IN 1957.

Bouraoui Belhadef is a commune made by the regroupment of  two douars (tribes): Beniftah (Ouled Messaouda, Essra, Essebt, Ghedir Elkebch, Sidi Ounis, Ouled Khellas and Ouled Amraan), and L'emsid (Beniaicha: Samaa, Errmila, Elakbia, and Boussbaa). The town village of Belhadef (18 km south of Daira El-ancer, Jijel) is a small vibrant town with tens of small shops and coffee shops,a local mosque,a post office, and the beautiful town hall building.

References

Communes of Jijel Province